The 1958 Xavier Musketeers football team competed in the 1958 NCAA College Division football season as an independent for Xavier University. The team was coached by Harry W. Connelly and played their home games at Xavier Stadium in Cincinnati, Ohio.

Schedule

References

Xavier
Xavier Musketeers football seasons
Xavier Musketeers football